Cape Morris Jesup is a headland in Peary Land, Greenland.

Geography
Cape Morris Jesup is the northernmost point of mainland Greenland. The cape marks the limit between the Lincoln Sea to the west and the Wandel Sea to the east.

History
Robert Peary reached the cape on 13 May 1900, believing it to be the northernmost point of land in the world, although it was later found to lie slightly to the south of the northernmost tip of Kaffeklubben Island. The cape is named after American philanthropist Morris Ketchum Jesup, president of the Peary Arctic Club, who helped finance Peary's expeditions.

Plants

Specimens of Arctic Poppy and Purple Saxifrage have been found growing in the thin, rocky soil.
Cape Morris Jesup is practically a polar desert with roughly 30-day summers. Despite these extremely inhospitable conditions, these two tiny flowering plants eek out a meager existence and persist blooming through summer lows in the high 20’s Fahrenheit.

See also
List of northernmost items

References

Morris Jesup
Peary Land